Old American Songs are two sets of songs arranged by Aaron Copland in 1950 and 1952 respectively, after research in the Sheet Music Collection of the Harris Collection of American Poetry and Plays, in the John Hay Library at Brown University. Originally scored for voice and piano, they were reworked for baritone (or mezzo-soprano) and orchestra.

Set 1 was first performed by Peter Pears (tenor) and Benjamin Britten (piano) on June 17, 1950 at Aldeburgh. The version of Set 1 for baritone and orchestra was premiered on January 7, 1955, by William Warfield and the Los Angeles Philharmonic, conducted by Alfred Wallenstein.

Set 2 was first performed by William Warfield and Aaron Copland (piano) on 25 May 1958 in Ipswich, Massachusetts, and later, in its orchestral form, by Grace Bumbry (mezzo-soprano) and the Ojai Festival Orchestra, conducted by the composer, in Ojai, California. Set 2 was recorded by Warfield and Copland on August 18, 1953, for Columbia Records but apparently not publicly performed until the above-mentioned date in Ipswich.

Set 1
The Boatman's Dance (minstrel song from 1843)
The Dodger (campaign song)
Long Time Ago (ballad)
Simple Gifts (Shaker song)
I Bought Me a Cat (children's song, Roud Folk Song Index No. 544)
Set 2
 The Little Horses (lullaby)
 Zion’s Walls (revivalist song)
 The Golden Willow Tree (Anglo-American ballad)
 At the River (hymn tune)
 Ching-A-Ring Chaw (minstrel song)

Both sets are published by Boosey & Hawkes. The voice and piano versions are easily transposed to any register; the orchestral sets can also be transposed but are usually sung in their original keys by either a baritone or a mezzo-soprano. Old American Songs have been recorded by many singers, notably mezzo-soprano Marilyn Horne and the baritones Sherill Milnes, Thomas Hampson, Bryn Terfel, and Thomas Quasthoff. William Warfield's recording is with the composer himself at the piano.

The songs have also been arranged for chorus: by Irving Fine (Set 1: songs 1, 3, and 5; Set 2: song 5), David L. Brunner (Set 1: songs 2 and 4; Set 2: song 1), Glenn Koponen (Set 2: song 2), Gregory Rose (Set 2: song 3), and Raymond Wilding-White (Set 2: song 4). These transcriptions went unrecorded until 1985, when a CD featuring the Mormon Tabernacle Choir and the Utah Symphony Orchestra conducted by Michael Tilson Thomas was released.

References

External links
 Library of Congress
 Video - Aaron Copland - "Old American Songs" (1 of 2) (12:23).
 Video - Aaron Copland - "Old American Songs" (2 of 2) (13:37).

Song cycles by Aaron Copland
Classical song cycles in English
1950 compositions
1952 compositions
Works based on Simple Gifts